Sheldon Wong (born 13 July 1960) is a Jamaican chess player who now resides in Orlando, Florida. He holds the National Master titles of both Jamaica and the United States.

Chess
In 1976, the 16-year-old Wong won the Jamaican Chess Championship and became the country's youngest National Master. That same year he represented Jamaica at the World Student Team Championship in Caracas, scoring 3½/8. In late 1976 and early 1977 he played for Jamaica at the World Junior Chess Championship in Groningen, where he was awarded a brilliancy prize for his win against the Israeli junior champion Nir Grinberg. After winning his first three games to co-lead the tournament, he suffered five consecutive losses, eventually finishing with 5½/13. He won the Jamaican championship again in 1977, and represented Jamaica at both the World Student Team Championship in Mexico City, where he scored 7/13, and the 1978 Chess Olympiad in Buenos Aires, where he scored 7½/14.

He later moved to the United States, where he gained the National Master title in 1992; however, he has played no rated tournaments since 1997.

External links
 Wong–Grinberg game, annotated by John Tobisch
 
 Sheldon Wong at 365chess.com

References

Jamaican chess players
1960 births
Jamaican people of Chinese descent
Living people